Hamza El Moussaoui (born 7 April 1993) is a Moroccan professional footballer who plays as a left-back for Moghreb Tétouan and the Morocco national team.

A youth product of Moghreb Tétouan, El Mousssaoui began his career with the club. He moved to ASFAR for the 2019-20 season, before returning to Moghreb Tétouan.

International career
El Moussaoui represented the Morocco national team in their title winning campaign at the 2020 African Nations Championship, where he played in all six matches and scored a goal.

Career statistics

International
Scores and results list Morocco's goal tally first.

References

External links
 
 
 MATFoot Profile

1993 births
Living people
People from Fnideq
Moroccan footballers
Morocco international footballers
Moghreb Tétouan players
AS FAR (football) players
Botola players
Association football fullbacks
21st-century Moroccan people
2020 African Nations Championship players
Morocco A' international footballers